The Cruiser Squadron was a naval formation of the British Home Fleet consisting of Armored cruisers of the Royal Navy from 1899 to 1905.

History
In October 1899 the Royal Navy's Training Squadron consisting mainly of sailing ships was abolished. On the 30 October the Cruiser Squadron was formed using more modern armoured cruisers. Commodore Edmund S. Poë was appointed its first commander. The squadron was assigned to the Home Fleet and existed until 1905.
.

Commodore and Rear-Admirals commanding
Post holders included:

References

Cruiser squadrons of the Royal Navy
Military units and formations established in 1899
Military units and formations disestablished in 1905